Rapid KL (styled as rapidKL) is a public transportation system owned by Prasarana Malaysia and operated by its subsidiaries Rapid Rail and Rapid Bus. With its coverage throughout Kuala Lumpur and Klang Valley areas, it was followed by a federal government restructuring of public transport systems in Kuala Lumpur after the bankruptcy of STAR and PUTRA Light Rapid Transit operators, the precursors to the Ampang/Sri Petaling Lines and Kelana Jaya Line respectively. In 2003, it had inherited bus services and assets formerly operated and owned by Intrakota and Cityliner after being bailed out. Four years later, the Malaysian government had bailed out KL Infrastructure Group, the owner and operation concession holder for the Kuala Lumpur monorail, and had placed it under ownership of Prasarana.

Rapid KL is part of the Klang Valley Integrated Transit System. The acronym stands for Rangkaian Pengangkutan Integrasi Deras Kuala Lumpur (English: Kuala Lumpur Rapid Integrated Transport Network).

History

Public transport restructuring 
The operation of Kuala Lumpur's Light Rapid Transit lines since its inception had lower ridership than expected, which led to the concessionaire operators of the LRT lines,  Sistem Transit Aliran Ringan Sdn Bhd (STAR-LRT) and Projek Usahasama Transit Ringan Automatik Sdn Bhd (PUTRA-LRT) being unable to repay their commercial loans. The 1997 Asian financial crisis aggravated the situation, and by November 2001, the two companies owed a combined total of RM5.7 billion. The Government of Malaysia's Corporate Debt Restructuring Committee (CDRC) stepped in to restructure the debts of the two LRT companies. In 2002, both companies and their respective LRT services were bought over by Prasarana Malaysia, and operations of the lines eventually were transferred to Rapid KL.

The Malaysian government would continue to bail out KL Infrastructure Group, which was the operator concessionaire holder and owner of the line, for RM 822 million. It was then promptly taken over by Prasarana Malaysia and operated by Rapid Rail since.

The bus service in Kuala Lumpur was also facing problems with lower ridership due to an increase in private car usage and a lack of capital investments. The two new bus consortia formed in the mid 1990s to consolidate all bus services in Kuala Lumpur, Intrakota Komposit and Cityliner, began facing financial problems. Intrakota had reportedly accumulated losses amounting to RM450 million from the 1997 financial crisis until Prasarana Malaysia took over in 2003. With decreased revenues, the bus operators could not maintain their fleets, much less invest in more buses. Frequencies and service deteriorated as buses began breaking down, and ridership suffered as a result. Public transport usage in the Klang Valley area dropped to about 16% of all total trips as a result.

Improvement steps

Rail network map
[
  {
    "type": "ExternalData",
    "service": "geoshape",
    "ids": "Q1865",
    "properties": {
      "stroke": "#000000",
      "fill-opacity": 0.2,
      "stroke-width": 5
    }
  },

{
  "type": "ExternalData",
  "service": "geoline",
  "ids": "Q474391",
  "properties": {
    "stroke": "#721422",
    "stroke-width": 6
  }
  },

{
  "type": "ExternalData",
  "service": "geoline",
  "ids": "Q248445",
  "properties": {
    "stroke": "#e0115f",
    "stroke-width": 6
  }
  },

{
  "type": "ExternalData",
  "service": "geoline",
  "ids": "Q1790833",
  "properties": {
    "stroke": "#7dba00",
    "stroke-width": 6
  }
},

{
    "type": "ExternalData",
    "service": "geoline",
    "ids": "Q6717618",
    "properties": {
      "stroke": "#008000",
      "stroke-width": 6
    }
  },
{
  "type": "ExternalData",
  "service": "geoline",
  "ids": "Q16255640",
  "properties": {
    "stroke": "#1e4d2b",
    "stroke-width": 6
  }
},
]

Services under Rapid KL

Rail 

The entire rail network, operated by Rapid Rail is 156.7 km long and has 116 stations. The network's trains can travel up to 80 km/h. In 2008, the rail network carried a total of over 350,000 passengers daily. The BRT Sunway Line, despite being operated by Rapid Bus, is a component of and integrated with the Rapid KL network.

Current services

Future services

Bus 

The entire bus network is operated by Rapid Bus, one of the largest bus operators in the Klang Valley area, along with Transnasional. Currently, there are 98 stage bus routes and 39 feeder bus services which operate from the rail stations. The bus routes operated by Rapid Bus were previously operated by Intrakota Komposit Sdn Bhd, a subsidiary of DRB-Hicom; and Cityliner Sdn Bhd, a subsidiary of Park May Bhd. In 2008, Rapid Bus carried around 390,000 passengers daily.

On 18 June 2020, Rapid Bus released new features on real time locations of bus in Google Maps, via collaboration with Google Transit. Almost 170 RapidKL bus routes are covered with this real time feature. Rapid Bus also plans to expand the application to MRT feeder bus service, Rapid Penang, and Rapid Kuantan in the future. Now all the buses can be tracked via PULSE application.

Fares and ticketing

Rapid Rail implements an automatic fare collection system with stored value tickets and single journey tickets in the form of tokens. Tickets can be purchased either from ticket vending machines or at station counters found at all train statioms stations. Turnstiles are located at the entrances to train platform, which separate the paid area and unpaid area of the stations. In 2011, Prasarana Malaysia announced a new ticketing system, effectively integrating the different rail lines which previously functioned as different systems. The new system allowed passengers to transfer seamlessly between rail lines at designated interchange stations without exiting the system and paying multiple fares or buying new tokens.

Touch 'n Go stored value cards are also accepted at fare gates on the Rapid Rail network as well as the Rapid Bus network as well as the KTM Komuter system to improve integration. The Touch 'n Go system is also used in the production of Rapid KL's monthly/weekly passes as well as their stored-value concession cards. These passes can be purchased by frequent users of the Rapid KL rail and bus networks, The Rapid KL concession cards are provided for students, the elderly and disabled people, which provides a 50% discount on all train and bus fares.

Services 
The rail services operate daily from 6a.m. to 10p.m. The operation hours will be extended for certain stations when special events such as the final of Piala Malaysia and New Year's Eve countdown were held.

During the Movement Control Order, the waiting times between trains were extended to 10 minutes during peak hours and 30 minutes during other times, as less people went outside due to the lockdown.

On 10 September, RapidKL reduced its waiting times for trains and buses to support the growing number of workers going back to their reopened workplaces. On peak hours, trains arrived at around 4 to 10 minutes, on non-peak hours, trains arrived from 7 to 12 minutes, and on weekends they arrived on 7 minutes (central business district for LRT Ampang/Sri Petaling) or 15 minutes.

Infrastructure
The Ampang Line consists of two sub-lines, one a north–south line and one heading eastward. The Chan Sow Lin-Sri Petaling route serves the southern part of Kuala Lumpur. The Chan Sow Lin-Ampang route primarily serves the suburb of Ampang in Selangor and the town of Pudu in Kuala Lumpur, both of which are located in the northeastern region of the Klang Valley. Both lines converge at Chan Sow Lin; the merged line leads north, terminating at Sentul Timur LRT station.

The Kelana Jaya Line consists of a single line that connects Petaling Jaya in the west to Gombak in the northeast, passing through the city centre and various low density residential areas further north in Kuala Lumpur. The line has a total of 870 individual bridges, the longest of which has a 68m span.

Stations

Since the Kelana Jaya and Ampang lines were intended to be operated by different owners during the planning and construction phase, both lines have unique and distinct station designs. Except for five underground stops between Pasar Seni and Ampang Park on the Kelana Jaya Line, the entirety of the LRT is elevated or at-grade. The Ampang Line consists of elevated and at-grade stations, while the Kelana Jaya Line comprises underground and elevated stations, in addition to one at-grade station. All trains are air-conditioned.

The Kelana Jaya Line runs in a northeast-southwesterly direction, consisting primarily of elevated stops and a handful of underground and at-grade stations. Of a total of 37 stations, 31 are elevated, and 5 stops are underground. The only at-grade station, Sri Rampai. The service depot is located in Subang.

The stations, like those of the Ampang Line, are styled in several types of architectural designs. Elevated stations, in most parts, were constructed in four major styles with distinctive roof designs for specific portions of the line. The KL Sentral station, added later, features a design more consistent with the Stesen Sentral station building. Underground stations, however, tend to feature unique concourse layout and vestibules, and feature floor-to-ceiling platform screen doors to prevent platform-to-track intrusions. 22 stations (including two terminal stations and the five subway stations) use a single island platform, while 15 others use two side platforms. Stations with island platforms allow easy interchange between north-bound and south-bound trains without requiring one to walk down/up to the concourse level.

On the Ampang Line, the system includes a total of 36 stations: eleven along the Chan Sow Lin-Sentul Timur line, seven along the Ampang LRT station-Chan Sow Lin line and eighteen along the Sri Petaling-Chan Sow Lin line. The service depot and primary train depots for the system are situated before the Ampang terminal station and the end of the Ampang-bound line, and beside the Putra Heights terminal at the end of Putra Heights-bound line. A secondary train depot is located after the Sri Petaling station.

The line between the Plaza Rakyat station to the Sentul Timur station is strictly elevated, with the line between the Bandaraya station to the Titiwangsa station running along the Gombak River. The Chan Sow Lin-Ampang line is primarily surface leveled, while the Chan Sow Lin-Plaza Rakyat line and the Sri Petaling-Chan Sow Lin line use a combination of surface leveled and elevated tracks. There are no subway lines in the system.

Notes

References

External links 
 
 Prasarana Malaysia Berhad

Bus transport in Malaysia
Malaysian brands
Transport in Kuala Lumpur
Transport in the Klang Valley
1995 establishments in Malaysia